A frisbee (pronounced ), also called a flying disc or simply a disc, is a gliding toy or sporting item that is generally made of injection-molded plastic and roughly  in diameter with a pronounced lip. It is used recreationally and competitively for throwing and catching, as in flying disc games. The shape of the disc is an airfoil in cross-section which allows it to fly by reducing the drag and increasing lift as it moves through the air, compared to a flat plate. Spinning the disc imparts a stabilizing gyroscopic force, allowing it to be both aimed with accuracy and thrown for distance.

A wide range is available of flying disc variants. Those for disc golf are usually smaller but denser compared to ultimate frisbee, and tailored for particular flight profiles to increase or decrease stability and distance. Disc dog sports use relatively slow-flying discs made of more pliable material to better resist a dog's bite and prevent injury to the dog. Flying rings are also available which typically travel significantly farther than any traditional flying disc. Illuminated discs are made of phosphorescent plastic or contain chemiluminescent fluid or battery-powered LEDs for play after dark. Others whistle when they reach a certain velocity in flight.

The term frisbee is often used generically to describe all flying discs, but Frisbee is a registered trademark of the Wham-O toy company. This protection results in organized sports such as ultimate or disc golf having to forgo use of the word "Frisbee".

History

Walter Frederick Morrison and his future wife Lucile had fun tossing a popcorn can lid after a Thanksgiving Day dinner in 1937. They soon discovered a market for a light-duty flying disc when they were offered 25 cents for a cake pan that they were tossing back and forth on a beach near Los Angeles, California, United States. "That got the wheels turning, because you could buy a cake pan for five cents, and if people on the beach were willing to pay a quarter for it, well—there was a business," Morrison told The Virginian-Pilot newspaper in 2007.

The Morrisons continued their business until World War II, when Walter served in the Army Air Force flying P-47s, and then was a prisoner of war. After the war, Morrison sketched a design for an aerodynamically improved flying disc that he called the Whirlo-Way, after the famous racehorse. He and business partner Warren Franscioni began producing the first plastic discs by 1948, after design modifications and experimentation with several prototypes. They renamed them the Flyin' Saucer in the wake of reported unidentified flying object sightings.

"We worked fairs, demonstrating it," Morrison told the Virginian-Pilot. The two of them once overheard someone saying that the pair were using wires to make the discs hover, so they developed a sales pitch: "The Flyin' Saucer is free, but the invisible wire is $1." "That's where we learned we could sell these things," he said, because people were enthusiastic about them.

Morrison and Franscioni ended their partnership in early 1950, and Morrison formed his own company in 1954 called American Trends to buy and sell Flyin' Saucers, which were being made of a flexible polypropylene plastic by Southern California Plastics, the original molder. He discovered that he could produce his own disc more cheaply, and he designed a new model in 1955 called the Pluto Platter, the archetype of all modern flying discs. He sold the rights to Wham-O on January 23, 1957. In 1958, Morrison was awarded U.S. Design Patent  for his product.

In June 1957, Wham-O co-founders Richard Knerr and Arthur "Spud" Melin gave the disc the brand name "Frisbee" after learning that college students were calling the Pluto Platter by that term, which was derived from the Connecticut-based pie manufacturer Frisbie Pie Company, a supplier of pies to Yale University, where students had started a campus craze tossing empty pie tins stamped with the company's logo—the way that Morrison and his wife had in 1937.

In November 1957, in what may be the first rock musical ever performed, Anything & Everything, written by visionary pioneer of information technology Ted Nelson (Theodor H. Nelson) when he was a junior at Swarthmore College (with Richard L. Capian), the game of Frisbee (spelled Frisby) is described (perhaps for the first time that the frisbee appeared in a formal manuscript) in the song "Friz Me the Frisby,” as a frisbee was passed among stooges in the audience. The scene was expressly intended as a way to introduce the game to the audience.

The man behind the Frisbee's success, however, was the Southern Californian Ed Headrick, hired in 1964 as Wham-O's general manager and vice president of marketing. Headrick redesigned the Pluto Platter by reworking the mold, mainly to remove the names of the planets, but fortuitously increasing the rim thickness and mass in the process, creating a more controllable disc that could be thrown more accurately.

Wham-O changed their marketing strategy to promote Frisbee use as a new sport, and sales increased. In 1964, the first professional model went on sale. Headrick patented its design; it featured raised ridges (the "Rings of Headrick") that were claimed to stabilize flight.

Headrick became known as the father of Frisbee sports; he founded the International Frisbee Association and appointed Dan Roddick as its head. Roddick began establishing North American Series (NAS) tournament standards for various Frisbee sports, such as Freestyle, Guts, Double Disc Court, and overall events. Headrick later helped to develop the sport of disc golf, which was first played with Frisbees and later with more aerodynamic beveled-rim discs, by inventing standardized targets called "pole holes." When Headrick died, he was cremated, and his ashes were molded into memorial discs and given to family and close friends and sold to benefit The Ed Headrick Memorial Museum.

The Frisbee was inducted into the National Toy Hall of Fame in 1998.

Variations of Flying Discs 
Flying discs, or known as Frisbee, have variations produced for different purposes to optimize variations between branches of disc sports. The three main categories are: ultimate disc, golf disc, and freestyle disc. Disc types are distinguished by differences in weight, diameter, and density. But all types of discs are created by designing molds in factories where plastic materials are melted and then injected into the molding machine.

Ultimate Disc 

Ultimate discs are designed to be used in the sport of Ultimate. Ultimate frisbees are made of durable plastic (often polyethylene) and are designed to be thrown for maximum distance and accuracy. Ultimate frisbee has a unique standard with a diameter of 10.75 inches and a weight of 175 grams. For competition uses, WFDF or other official organizations set disc standards to ensure quality. Ultimate discs have a convexed rim and a flat top, which allows for precise throws and catches. The unit price for an ultimate disc is normally bounded within 10-20 USD.

Disc Golf 

Another type of flying disc is the disc golf disc, which is used in the sport of disc golf. Disc golf discs are similar in size and shape to ultimate discs, but have different weights and designs. The material often used to make golf discs is polypropylene. There are three main types of disc golf discs: drivers, mid-range discs, and putters. Each type is designed for a specific purpose, with drivers being used for long-distance throws, mid-range discs for more controlled shots, and putters for short and accurate throws into the target. The rim for golf discs are sharper than ultimate frisbee, to reduce wind drag. For each type of the golf disc, there are hundreds of variations. However, there is a uniform requirement in the size of discs: the minimum diameter of a golf disc is 21 centimeters (8.27 inches). Price of a single golf disc is around 8-20 USD depending on quality and brand.

Freestyle Disc 

Freestyle discs are another variation of flying discs that are used in freestyle Frisbee competitions. These discs are usually smaller and lighter than other types of flying discs. Most freestyle discs have a diameter of 10 inches or less and a weight of around 160 grams, but this is subjected to change according to the performer's need. They are designed to be highly maneuverable, with a more rounded shape and a low profile that makes them easy to catch and perform tricks with.

Overall, all ultimate frisbees share the same size, weight, and shape. Whereas golf disc has many variations for different uses just as golf shafts in the traditional golf sport. Freestyle disc more depends on the performers' needs and weather conditions.

Disc sports

The IFT guts competitions in Northern Michigan, the Canadian Open Frisbee Championships (1972), Toronto, Ontario, the Vancouver Open Frisbee Championships (1974), Vancouver, British Columbia, the Octad (1974), New Jersey, the American Flying Disc Open (1974), Rochester, New York, and the World Frisbee Championships (1974), Pasadena, California, are the earliest Frisbee competitions that presented the Frisbee as a new disc sport. Before these tournaments, the Frisbee was considered a toy and used for recreation.

Double disc court
Double disc court was invented and introduced in 1974 by Jim Palmeri, a sport played with two flying discs and two teams of two players. Each team defends its court and tries to land a flying disc in the opposing court.

Disc dog
Dogs and their human flying disc throwers compete in events such as distance catching and somewhat choreographed freestyle catching.

Disc golf
This is a precision and accuracy sport in which individual players throw a flying disc at a target pole hole. In 1926, In Bladworth, Saskatchewan, Canada, Ronald Gibson and a group of his Bladworth Elementary school chums played a game using metal lids, they called "Tin Lid Golf". In 1976, the game of disc golf was standardized with targets called "pole holes" invented and developed by Wham-O's Ed Headrick.

Freestyle competition
In 1974, freestyle competition was created and introduced by Ken Westerfield and Discraft's Jim Kenner. Teams of two or three players are judged as they perform a routine that consists of a series of creative throwing and catching techniques set to music.

Goaltimate
A half-court disc game derived from ultimate, similar to hot box. The object is to advance the disc on the field of play by passing, and score points by throwing the flying disc to a teammate in a small scoring area.

Guts
The game of guts was invented by the Healy Brothers in the 1950s and developed at the International Frisbee Tournament (IFT) in Eagle Harbor, Michigan. Two teams of one to five team members stand in parallel lines facing each other across a court and throw flying discs at members of the opposing team.

KanJam
A patented game scoring points by throwing and deflecting the flying disc and hitting or entering the goal. The game ends when a team scores exactly 21 points or "chogs" the disc for an instant win.

Ultimate
The most widely played disc game began in the late 1960s with Joel Silver and Jared Kass. In the 1970s, it developed as an organized sport with the creation of the Ultimate Players Association by Dan Roddick, Tom Kennedy and Irv Kalb. The object of the game is to advance the disc and score points by eventually passing the disc to a team member in the opposing team's end zone. Players may not run while holding the disc.

See also 

 Aerobie
 AUDL
 Boomerang
 Flying ring
 Flying cylinder
 Ultimate Canada
 USA Ultimate

Notes

References

Further reading

 
 
 Norton, Gary, The Official Frisbee Handbook, New York, Toronto, London: Bantam Books, 1972

External links

 World Flying Disc Federation (WFDF) – international sports governing body for flying disc games
 History of Frisbee and Disc Sports
 Flying Disc Museum
 All Frisbee Throw and catch techniques

1950s toys
Products introduced in 1948
American inventions
Brands that became generic
 
Physical activity and dexterity toys
Sports equipment
Wham-O brands
Sports originating in the United States